Troy Ready (born May 15, 1980 in Spokane, Washington) is a former American soccer player, who played as a midfielder, and current head coach of Vancouver Victory. After his professional career with the Timbers, Ready moved to Tajikistan where he played professionally for Vakhsh Qurghonteppa and later headed up the development of football in Tajikistan, before returning to Portland Timbers as a chaplain.

Career

Youth
Ready attended Mead Senior High School.  While in high school, he played for the Spokane Shadow of the USISL, continuing with the team through his collegiate career.  In 1999, he entered the University of Washington where he played on the men’s soccer team.  He redshirted his junior season after breaking his leg during the 2001 pre-season.

Professional
On December 17, 2003, the Seattle Sounders selected Ready in the first round of the USL First Division draft.  The Sounders did not sign him as he decided to pursue trials with teams in Norway.  Ready was wanted by Clubs IK Start and Skeid of the Norway's Professional League, but was unable to obtain a work permit. At the end of this year, he returned to the Spokane Shadow. Ready played with the Shadow for eight years and tallied more appearances than anyone in club history. Premier Development League. In 2005, he moved to the Cascade Surge of the PDL, playing eleven games.  On March 30, 2006, Ready signed with the Portland Timbers of the USL First Division.  He played three seasons before needing a surgery. Ready moved to Tajikistan in 2009, signing with Vakhsh Qurghonteppa with whom he won the Tajik League with in 2009, before returning to the USA after four seasons.

Administrative
In the autumn of 2010, Ready struck a deal with his former club Portland Timbers, to supply Vakhsh's youth teams with sports equipment. In February 2013, Ready was appointed as Technical Director of the Tajikistan Football Federation. In this role, Ready has expanded the number of youth clubs to 18, 12 male and 6 female, and also opened a national goalkeeper academy.

Managerial
On 16 February 2017, Ready was appointed as manager of Evergreen Premier League side Vancouver Victory.

Honours
Vakhsh Qurghonteppa
Tajik League (1): 2009

References

External links
 Portland Timbers profile

1980 births
Living people
American soccer players
American expatriate soccer players
Association football midfielders
Cascade Surge players
Sportspeople from Spokane, Washington
Portland Timbers (2001–2010) players
Soccer players from Washington (state)
Spokane Shadow players
USL League Two players
USL First Division players
USISL players
Washington Huskies men's soccer players
Expatriate footballers in Tajikistan
Vakhsh Qurghonteppa players
Tajikistan Higher League players